Antonio Llamas Perezchica  (born April 20, 1966) is a Mexican professional baseball player and coach. He played in Major League Baseball as an infielder from -. He is currently the third base coach for the Arizona Diamondbacks of Major League Baseball (MLB).

Professional career

San Francisco Giants
Perezchica was drafted by the San Francisco Giants in the third round of the 1984 Major League Baseball Draft. He began his professional career that year with the Short-Season Everett Giants of the Northwest League. He batted .193 with six doubles and one triples in 33 games.

In his second professional season, Perezchica was promoted to the Class-A Clinton Giants of the Midwest League. He hit .241 with 109 hits, 21 doubles, eight triples and for home runs in 127 games.

He spent the  season with the Class-A Fresno Giants of the California League. Perezchica hit .279 with 30 doubles, eight triples, and nine home runs in 126 games.

With the Double-A Shreveport Captains of the Texas League in  hit .319 with 24 doubles, one triple and 11 home runs in 89 games.

The next season, Perezchica split time with the Triple-A Phoenix Firebirds and the Major League Giants. He hit .306 with 18 doubles, 10 triples and nine home runs in 134 games with Phoenix. In limited time at the Major League level, Perezchica had one hit in eight at-bats and seven games. He played six games in the field, two for starts, and they were all at second base.

Perezchica played the  season at the Triple-A level with the Phoenix Firebirds of the Pacific Coast League. He hit .231 with 11 doubles, three triples and eight home runs in 94 games. He did not play at the Major League level in 1989.

In , Perezchica again split the season with the Triple-A Phoenix Firebirds and the Giants. He hit .268 with 22 doubles, six triples and nine home runs. With the Major League club in  Perezchica had one hit in three at-bats. He played two games at second base and two games at shortstop.

He hit .293 at Triple-A with 10 doubles, four triples and eight home runs. With the Giants Perezchica batted .229 with four doubles, one triple and three RBIs in 23 games. The Giants then placed Perezchica on waivers.

Cleveland Indians
On August 6, 1991 the Cleveland Indians claimed Perezchica waivers from the Giants. He spent the final 17 games with Cleveland, batting .364 with eight hits and two doubles.

In , Perezchica split the season between the Indians and the Triple-A Colorado Springs Sky Sox. He hit only .171 at Triple-A with one double, two home runs and nine RBIs. At the Major League level, Perezchica hit .100 with only two hits in 20 at-bats. He was granted free agency after the season.

New York Yankees
In  he began to play in the New York Yankees organization, splitting the season between the Double-A Albany-Colonie Yankees of the Eastern League and the Triple-A Columbus Clippers of the International League. He hit a combined .321 with 17 doubles, seven triples, 11 home runs, 33 RBIs and one stolen base in 72 games.

In his final season, Perezchica spent the entire season with the Triple-A Columbus Clippers. He batted .257 with 12 doubles, four triples, seven home runs, 44 RBIs and three stolen bases.

Coaching career

New York Yankees

Arizona Diamondbacks

After the 2016 season, the Diamondbacks hired Perezchica as their third base coach.

References

External links

1966 births
Albany-Colonie Yankees players
Arizona Diamondbacks coaches
Clinton Giants players
Cleveland Indians players
Colorado Springs Sky Sox players
Columbus Clippers players
Everett Giants players
Living people
Major League Baseball infielders
Mexican expatriate baseball players in the United States
Phoenix Firebirds players
San Francisco Giants players
Shreveport Captains players